Michael John Nelson (born October 11, 1964) is an American comedian and writer, most known for his work on the television series Mystery Science Theater 3000 (MST3K). Nelson was the head writer of the series for most of the show's original eleven-year run, and spent half of that time as the on-air host, also named Mike Nelson. In addition to writing books, Nelson is currently part of the online movie riffing site RiffTrax, and was previously part of the straight-to-DVD Film Crew with fellow MST3K alumni, Bill Corbett and Kevin Murphy.

Early life
Michael John Nelson was born in the Chicago suburb of St. Charles, Illinois. His ancestry is Danish, German, and Irish. He lived in Geneva, Illinois, until the age of twelve, when his family moved to north-western Wisconsin. He studied theatre and music at the University of Wisconsin–River Falls, but he left before graduating and moved to the Minneapolis–Saint Paul area.

Career

Mystery Science Theater 3000
Nelson was working as a waiter at T.G.I. Friday's and doing occasional stand-up comedy when he was offered a job on Mystery Science Theater 3000, typing the suggestions in the writing room. The writers told him to feel free to make some comments on the movies they were watching, and Nelson impressed them so much with his wit and comedic timing that they made him a staff writer, and, later, head writer. Nelson also appeared frequently in the show's host segments, often playing characters from the movies being mocked such as Torgo from the infamous Manos - The Hands of Fate.

When series creator and host Joel Hodgson decided to leave the show halfway through the fifth season, he chose Nelson as his replacement, reportedly because he thought Nelson was a natural leader, a gifted comedian, and a gifted muse, and also because Nelson simply looked good standing next to the show's puppets. Nelson remained in the host role for another five and a half seasons (surviving the show's switching networks from Comedy Central to the Sci-Fi Channel) until the original show's final Sci-Fi Channel episode aired in 1999.

Post-MST3K
Writing

Since the series ended, Nelson has worked steadily as a writer, publishing several books (as of March 2006): Mike Nelson's Movie Megacheese, Mike Nelson's Mind Over Matters and Mike Nelson's Death Rat!, the last being his first novel. His other works include a series of pop-culture humor books, Happy Kitty Bunny Pony, Goth-Icky, and Love Sick, as well as a monthly column for Home Theater Magazine. He also wrote for the short-lived game show Let's Bowl, which gained a cult following of its own. He has commentary tracks for DVD releases of several films, including Reefer Madness, The Little Shop of Horrors, House on Haunted Hill, Plan 9 from Outer Space, Carnival of Souls, and Night of the Living Dead. With his MST3K co-stars Kevin Murphy and Bill Corbett, he was part of a comedy team called "The Film Crew", which has created comedy segments for National Public Radio. The first Film Crew DVD, Hollywood After Dark, was released July 10, 2007, and three more followed in the months after. 

Legend Films | RiffTrax

In 2006, Nelson was appointed Chief Content Producer for Legend Films. He is responsible for building and leading the company's creative content, providing continuous commentaries, and developing other premium web-based programming. "I'm very excited. Legend Films is such a great fit for me—talented people who consistently put out a great product. Plus, there are Flaming Hot Cheetos in the lunch room vending machine. That made it an easy choice to join the team," enthused Nelson.

One of the projects put together by Nelson and Legend Films was RiffTrax, a website offering the purchase of downloadable audio commentaries once again costarring two former MST3K cast members Kevin Murphy and Bill Corbett. The first commentary made available through the service was for Road House. In a September 2006 interview, Nelson said he felt that Rifftrax may be the closest thing to a reunion of the Mystery Science Theater 3000 team. In 2016, additional MST3K alumni, Joel Hodgson, Trace Beaulieu, and Frank Conniff, all appeared for a live reunion at the State Theatre in Minneapolis with Nelson, Murphy and Corbett. They were also joined by the newest host, Jonah Ray.

Voice work

In 2013, Nelson agreed to do voiceover work for Armikrog. Nelson voices the lead character, Tommynaut.

Podcasts

In 2016, Nelson and David Berge started the podcast Like Trees Walking. They look at life and faith from a Christian perspective, with a lightly humorous, offbeat approach.

Since 2017, he has created, with Conor Lastowka, the podcast 372 Pages We'll Never Get Back, which analyses books of dubious quality.

Personal life

Nelson is married to fellow MST3K writer Bridget Jones, and the pair have two sons. They moved from the Minneapolis, Minnesota-area to San Diego, California, in mid-2006, and moved back to Minneapolis in 2014.

He has described the role of Christianity in his family as "the very centerpiece of our lives. We're heavily involved in our church, my wife works with youth groups and churches as her profession, and almost every career and life decision I make depends upon it." He studies Christian apologetics and cites William Lane Craig and C.S. Lewis as influences.

See also 
 Mystery Science Theater 3000
 Timmy Big Hands
 RiffTrax

References

External links

 
 LAist.com Interview with Michael J. Nelson
 Mike Nelson interviewed on "The Joe Cook Program" 9/24/06
 Michael Nelson Reddit Questionnaire (March 22, 2011)
 RiffTrax profile

1964 births
Living people
American male comedians
American male television actors
American people of Danish descent
People from St. Charles, Illinois
Writers from Minneapolis
Writers from San Diego
University of Wisconsin–River Falls alumni
Minnesota Republicans
American Protestants
American television writers
American male screenwriters
American male television writers
American comedy writers
People from Geneva, Illinois
Comedians from Illinois
Screenwriters from California
Screenwriters from Illinois
Screenwriters from Minnesota
Comedians from California
21st-century American comedians
21st-century American screenwriters
21st-century American male writers